The Battle of Yesil Kol Nor is an 18th-century war painting created by Chinese court painters and European Jesuits. It was commissioned by the Qianlong Emperor of the Chinese Qing dynasty as part of an order of 16 large battle paintings (8 metres wide by 4 metres tall) to commemorate battles that took place in Qurman, in modern-day Tajikistan in February 1759. The battles resulted in the Qing Empire successfully regaining control of Xinjiang from the Turks who had occupied the province following the ousting of the Dzungar people from the region by Qing forces.

References

Qing dynasty
Yesil Kol Nor